"City with No Children" is a single from Arcade Fire's third album The Suburbs. It was released as a single on March 14, 2011.

Track listings
Promo CD single
 "City with No Children" – 3:11

Credits and personnel
 Win Butler – lead vocals, guitar
 Régine Chassagne – backing vocals, drums
 Richard Reed Parry – guitar, string arrangements
 Tim Kingsbury – bass
 William Butler – keyboards, guitar
 Sarah Neufeld – violin, backing vocals, string arrangements
 Jeremy Gara – drums
 Owen Pallett – string arrangements
 Marika Anthony Shaw – string arrangements
 Arcade Fire and Markus Dravs – producers
 Craig Silvey and Nick Launay – mixing

Chart performance

References

External links
 Official website

2010 songs
Arcade Fire songs
Merge Records singles
Song recordings produced by Markus Dravs
2011 singles
Mercury Records singles
Songs written by William Butler (musician)
Songs written by Win Butler
Songs written by Régine Chassagne
Songs written by Jeremy Gara
Songs written by Tim Kingsbury
Songs written by Richard Reed Parry